The National Center for Advancing Translational Sciences (NCATS) was established on December 23, 2011 and is located in Bethesda, Maryland. NCATS is one of 27 institutes and centers of the US National Institutes of Health (NIH), an agency of the US Department of Health and Human Services. The mission of NCATS is to transform scientific discoveries into new treatments and cures for disease that can be delivered faster to patients. The budget provided to NCATS for fiscal year 2018 is $557,373,000.

History

NCATS was created on December 23, 2011 by the Consolidated Appropriations Act, 2012.

The center was created from a number of existing NIH programs:
 Clinical and Translational Science Award program
 Components of the Molecular Libraries Program
 Therapeutics for Rare and Neglected Diseases
 RAID renamed Bridging Interventional Development Gaps
 Office of Rare Diseases Research
 NIH–FDA Regulatory Science Initiative
 Cures Acceleration Network (CAN)

Directors 
Past Directors 2011 - present

Divisions 
NCATS is organized into a number of divisions:
 Division of Clinical Innovation
 Division of Pre-Clinical Innovation
 Office of Administrative Management
 Office of Grants Management and Scientific Review
 Office of Rare Diseases Research: Oversees the Rare Diseases Clinical Research Network and Genetic and Rare Diseases Information Center (GARD)
 Office of Strategic Alliances: Works with businesses in the biotech and pharmaceutical industry to speed the development of new drugs

Programs and initiatives

Overview 
The stated goal of NCATS is to promote research in both existing and new areas of medicine and science, in order to promote public health and to overcome high failure rates in clinical trials. To accomplish this, NCATS supports 31 programs and initiatives that relate to translational research and improving the speed of therapeutic development. The 31 programs and initiatives involve a range of STEM-related fields including biology, biochemistry, chemistry, bioengineering, virology, genetics, and data science. Within the realm of translational science, issues that NCATS is particularly focused on addressing using its programs, initiatives, and partnerships include increasing the success and de-risking the costs associated with therapeutic development, incentivizing more collaborative work, and addressing data transparency issues.

COVID response 
During the COVID-19 pandemic, NCATS launched an open data initiative to promote collaborative sharing of COVID-related drug data. An additional data sharing partnership with several other government institutes resulted in a study detailing the COVID-related risks for patients with chronic obstructive pulmonary disease.

See also
Translational research

References

National Institutes of Health
Medical research institutes in Maryland